This is a list of Brazilian comedy films.

Feature length films

1950s
1959
Black Orpheus
O Homem do Sputnik

1970s
1970
A Arte de Amar Bem
The Alienist
Ascensão e Queda de um Paquera
Betão Ronca Ferro

1971
Pra Quem Fica, Tchau

1978
Mônica e Cebolinha: No Mundo de Romeu e Julieta

1979
A Banda das Velhas Virgens

1985 
The Adventures of Sergio Mallandro

1986 
Os Trapalhões e o Rei do Futebol

2000 
O Auto da Compadecida
Bossa Nova
Castelo Rá-Tim-Bum

2001 
Caramuru: A Invenção do Brasil

2002 
Que sera, sera

2003 
The Man Who Copied

2003 
Meu Tio Matou um Cara

2005 
O Casamento de Romeu e Julieta

2006 
O Cheiro do Ralo
Se Eu Fosse Você

2007 
Chega de Saudade
Ó Paí, Ó
Saneamento Básico

2008 
Apenas o Fim
Casa da Mãe Joana

2010 
Bollywood Dream
De Pernas pro Ar
Reflexões de um Liquidificador

2011 
Brasil Animado
Cilada.com
The Clown
Teste de Elenco'

 2012 As Aventuras de Agamenon, o RepórterAté que a Sorte nos SepareBuddiesDe Pernas pro Ar 2Eu Não Faço a Menor Ideia do que eu Tô Fazendo Com a Minha VidaInsônia 2013 Até que a Sorte nos Separe 2Casa da Mãe Joana 2Cine HolliúdyO ConcursoConfissões de AdolescenteThe DognapperMeu Passado Me CondenaMinha Mãe é uma PeçaOdeio o Dia dos NamoradosSe Puder... Dirija!Vai que Dá Certo 2014 Copa de Elite Julio SumiuMuita Calma Nessa Hora 2Os Homens São de Marte... E é pra Lá que Eu Vou!S.O.S Mulheres ao Mar!''

See also
 Lists of comedy films

Lists of comedy films